The 2017 Constellation Cup was the 8th Constellation Cup series played between Australia and New Zealand. The series featured four netball test matches, played in October 2017. The Australia team was coached by Lisa Alexander and captained by Caitlin Bassett. New Zealand were coached by Janine Southby and captained by Katrina Grant. Australia won all four tests to win the series 4–0.

Squads

Australia

Notes
 Sharni Layton and Madison Robinson were included in the squad announced in June 2017. However, Layton withdrew and Robinson was dropped from the final squad.

Milestones
 Caitlin Bassett scored her 2000th international goal in the second test on 8 October 2017.

New Zealand

Umpires

Matches

First test

Second test

Third test

Fourth test

References

2017
2017 in New Zealand netball
2017 in Australian netball
October 2017 sports events in New Zealand
October 2017 sports events in Australia